Hannah Elizabeth Milhous Nixon (March 7, 1885 – September 30, 1967) was the mother of President Richard Nixon.

Richard described his mother as "a Quaker saint". On May 9, 1970 (Richard Nixon's visit to the Lincoln Memorial), he insisted on stopping at the United States Capitol, where he took his former seat in the chamber of the U.S. House of Representatives and instructed his valet Manolo Sanchez to make a speech. Sanchez spoke of his pride in being a citizen of the United States and Richard and some female cleaners who were present applauded. One of the women present, Carrie Moore, asked Richard to sign her bible, which he did, and holding her hand told her that his mother "was a saint" and "you be a saint too".

Hannah Nixon is acknowledged to have exerted a tremendous effect on her son's outlook throughout his life. In Richard's final remarks at the White House on August 9, 1974, he said, "Nobody will ever write a book, probably, about my mother. Well, I guess all of you would say this about your mother – my mother was a saint. And I think of her, two boys dying of tuberculosis, nursing four others in order that she could take care of my older brother for three years in Arizona, and seeing each of them die, and when they died, it was like one of her own. Yes, she will have no books written about her. But she was a saint."

Early life
She was born Hannah Elizabeth Milhous near Butlerville, Indiana, the daughter of Almira Park (née Burdg; 1849-1943), who was from Columbiana County, Ohio, and Franklin Milhous (1848-1919), a native of Colerain Township, Belmont County, Ohio.

Family
She was married to Francis A. Nixon and had five sons:

Harold Samuel Nixon (June 1, 1909 – March 7, 1933)
Richard Milhous Nixon (January 9, 1913 – April 22, 1994), 37th president of the United States, married to Thelma Catherine Patricia Ryan and had two daughters.
Francis Donald Nixon (November 23, 1914 – June 27, 1987), married to Clara Jane Lemke and had three children, including Donald A. Nixon
Arthur Burdg Nixon (May 26, 1918 – August 10, 1925)
Edward Calvert Nixon (May 3, 1930 – February 27, 2019)

In popular culture
Mary Steenburgen portrayed Hannah Nixon in the 1995 Oliver Stone film Nixon.

References

	

1885 births
1967 deaths
American Quakers
Burials at Rose Hills Memorial Park
Housewives
Mothers of presidents of the United States
Mothers of vice presidents of the United States
Nixon family
People from Jennings County, Indiana